Radlett Aerodrome was an airfield and aircraft manufacturing plant in Hertfordshire, now owned by Eon Productions. Part of the airfield is now the M25 between junctions 21 (A405) and 22 (A1081).

History
The airfield was also known as RAF Radlett; No. 80 Wing RAF was based there.
In the 2010s plans for the future use of the site's land were the subject of lengthy dispute but in 2020 it was agreed that it would be redeveloped as a rail freight terminal.

Structure
The Handley Page works were situated on the east of the former A5, then a main road into London from the Midlands. The site is between the A5 road, to the west, and the Midland Main Line, to the east. The M25 motorway crosses the entire former site from east to west.

References

External links
 UK Airfields
 Britain from Above in 1948

Aircraft assembly plants in England
Airports in Hertfordshire
Economy of Hertfordshire
Handley Page
M25 motorway
World War II airfields in the United Kingdom